Almirante Viel is a Polar Class 5 icebreaker currently under construction in Chile. Previously referred to with the project name Antartica 1, it will replace the 1969-built second-hand vessel Almirante Óscar Viel acquired from Canada in 1994 and decommissioned in 2019. Accounts differ as to when construction of the ship began. The Santiago Times reported the first steel was cut in May 2017, while Jane's Navy International reported construction began in August 2018.  

She will displace 13,000 tons. Her maximum speed will be .  

She will have the capacity to house 150 crew and researchers or passengers.  

Maritime Executive reports that when completed, in 2022, she will be comparable to Argentina's .

References

Icebreakers of the Chilean Navy